Sprawl can refer to:

Sprawl (grappling), a defensive technique in wrestling and martial arts used to prevent a takedown.
Urban sprawl, also called suburban sprawl
Server sprawl, when servers in a data center are underused
Sprawl trilogy, a trilogy of novels by William Gibson
The Sprawl, the nickname of Titan Station, the setting of the video game Dead Space 2

See also